The Elk Rapids Township Hall is a former government building located on River Street in Elk Rapids, Michigan. It was designated a Michigan State Historic Site in 1973 and listed on the National Register of Historic Places in 1977. The building was refurbished, and as of 2020, the building served as a rental space and performance venue known as HERTH Hall (for Historic Elk Rapids Township Hall).

History
The site of the Township Hall is near the location that Abram Wadsworth, the first white settler in the area, lived. By the 1880s, Elk Rapids was a prosperous community that needed a permanent meeting place. The Township Hall was constructed in 1883 from a design by local architect Charles Peale.  From the beginning, it was designed to serve both governmental and social functions, housing the town government and containing performance space.  The hall hosted plays and vaudeville performances, and in the 1940s it was used as a school gymnasium and auditorium.

In the 1950s, demolition of the Township Hall was discussed, but voted down.  In 1967, demolition was again discussed, but by 1972, the decision had been made to restore it.  In 1974, the Elk Rapids Area Historical Society formed and began a restoration program.  In 2004, the township office moved out of the building.  In 2009, the Historic Elk Rapids Town Hall Association (HERTHA) was formed to operate and maintain the building.  It serves as a performance space and is available for rental.

Description

The Elk Rapids Township Hall is a rectangular, single-story structure, constructed of buff-colored brick with a mansard roof. The entrance is reached through a modern rectangular vestibule addition. The side walls have round-arch windows with stepped buttress piers. Inside, the main hall seats approximately 180 guests, with the stage retaining its early twentieth-century valley scene.

After extensive renovation, HERTH Hall is a venue available to rent for wedding events, reunions, concerts, parties and more.

References

External links

Historic Elk Rapids Town Hall Web site

Buildings and structures in Antrim County, Michigan
Government buildings completed in 1883
Community centers in Michigan
Former theatres in the United States
National Register of Historic Places in Antrim County, Michigan
City and town halls in Michigan
City and town halls on the National Register of Historic Places in Michigan